Nadia Petrova and Martina Navratilova were the defending champions, but Navratilova retired from the sport on September 10, 2006, and only Petrova competed that year. 
Petrova partnered with Svetlana Kuznetsova, but lost in the quarterfinals to Nathalie Dechy and Sun Tiantian.

Katarina Srebotnik and Ai Sugiyama won in the final 6–4, 2–6, 10–5, against Cara Black and Liezel Huber.

Seeds
The top four seeds receive a bye into the second round.

Draw

Finals

Top half

Bottom half

External links
Doubles Draw

Cup - Doubles